Foinaven oilfield is a deep-water oil development approximately  west of the Shetland Islands.  Together with Schiehallion, Loyal, Solan, Clair and Lancaster fields it forms the area generally termed as the West of Shetland.

Field description
Foinaven oil field was discovered in 1992. It is named after a mountain in the North West Highlands.

Production
The Foinaven field is operated by BP in partnership with RockRose Energy. The development of the field was sanctioned in 1994 and the oil production in Foinaven started in November 1997. The phase 1 with 21 wells was completed in 2000.

Oil was produced by subsea wells via a manifold, which passed through rigid flowlines and then flexible risers into a Floating Production Storage and Offloading system (FPSO). 

It was permanently stationed in the field and the crude oil was exported by shuttle tankers. Oil was exported primarily to the Flotta oil terminal in Orkney with smaller amounts going to Tranmere Oil Terminal on Merseyside.

Approximately half of the produced associated gas was used for enhanced oil recovery in the field. The remainder was exported through the West of Shetland pipeline to the Sullom Voe Terminal. Some of the exported gas was used as fuel in the Fortum operated Sullom Voe power station. The remainder was enriched with liquefied petroleum gas and exported to the Magnus platform for enhanced oil recovery in the Magnus field.

According to BP, to date, 390 million barrels of oil have been recovered from the Foinaven area.

Suspension of Production
In April 2021, BP suspended production from the Foinaven field as the long-serving FPSO Petrojarl Foinaven through which the fields were producing oil was nearing the end of its 25-year design life. It was removed in 2022 to be scrapped at Frederikshavn in Denmark. BP and its partners have begun evaluating options to develop the estimated remaining resources of up to a possible 200 million barrels from the Foinaven field and surrounding area.

References

External links

	
Oil fields west of Shetland
BP oil and gas fields